Massimo Florioli (born 14 February 1972) is an Italian professional golfer. He represented Italy in the 1997 and 1998 World Cup. In the 1998 tournament Florioli and his teammate, Costantino Rocca, finished second, two strokes behind England, recording the best performance by an Italian pair in the event at that time.

Florioli played on the European Tour from 1997 to 2001. He didn't win a European Tour event but was second in the 1998 Peugeot Open de France and the 1999 Estoril Open. He was joint third in the 1998 Benson & Hedges International Open winning €59,108.

Professional wins (4)

Challenge Tour wins (1)

Other wins (3)
1990 Spanish Junior Championship Professional
1993 Italian PGA Championship
1994 Italian PGA Championship
1997 Italian National Open

Team appearances
Amateur
Jacques Léglise Trophy (representing the Continent of Europe): 1989
European Youths' Team Championship (representing Italy): 1990 (winners)
 Eisenhower Trophy (representing Italy): 1990
European Amateur Team Championship (representing Italy): 1991

Professional
World Cup (representing Italy): 1997, 1998

References

External links

Italian male golfers
European Tour golfers
Mediterranean Games gold medalists for Italy
Mediterranean Games medalists in golf
Competitors at the 1991 Mediterranean Games
1972 births
Living people